Parliamentary elections were held in Estonia on 4 March 2007. The newly elected 101 members of the 11th Riigikogu assembled at Toompea Castle in Tallinn within ten days of the election. It was the world's first nationwide vote where part of the voting was carried out in the form of remote electronic voting via the internet.

The election saw the Estonian Reform Party emerged as the largest faction in the Riigikogu with 31 seats. The Estonian Centre Party finished second with 29 seats, whilst the new Union of Pro Patria and Res Publica lost 16 seats compared to the 35 won by the two parties in the 2003 elections. The Social Democrats gained 4 seats, whilst the Greens entered the Riigikogu for the first time with 6 seats and the People's Union lost seven of its 13 seats.

Background
The Centre Party, led by the mayor of Tallinn Edgar Savisaar, had been increasingly excluded from collaboration, since his open collaboration with Putin's United Russia party, real estate scandals in Tallinn, and the Bronze Soldier controversy, considered as a deliberate attempt to split Estonian society by provoking the Russian minority.

Electoral system

In 2007 Estonia held its and the world's first national Internet election. Voting was available from February 26 to 28. A total of 30,275 citizens (3.4%) used Internet voting.

Electronic voting in Estonia began in October 2005 local elections when Estonia became the first country to have legally binding general elections using the Internet as a means of casting the vote and was declared a success by the Estonian election officials.

The electoral system was a two-tier semi-open list proportional representation system with a 5% (27,510.65 votes) election threshold.

Seats by electoral district

Results

References

External links
Opinion Polls
Estonia European Election Database

2007
Estonia
Parliamentary election
Estonian election